Grace Angela Morgan (5 May 1909 – 20 October 1996) was an English cricketer who played as a wicket-keeper. She appeared in two Test matches for England between 1949 and 1951. She played domestic cricket for Surrey.

Her two Test matches were against New Zealand at Eden Park, Auckland in 1949, and against Australia at The Oval in 1951. She also umpired one test match, between England and New Zealand at New Road, Worcester in 1954.

References

External links
 
 

1909 births
1996 deaths
People from Richmond, London
England women Test cricketers
Surrey women cricketers
English Test cricket umpires